The 1987 Auburn Tigers football team represented Auburn University in the 1987 NCAA Division I-A football season.  Coached by Pat Dye, the team finished the season with a 9–1–2 record and won their first of three straight Southeastern Conference (SEC) titles.  Auburn went on to tie an undefeated Syracuse team in the 1988 Sugar Bowl, 16–16.

Schedule

Season summary

Texas

Kansas

Georgia

References

Auburn
Auburn Tigers football seasons
Southeastern Conference football champion seasons
Sugar Bowl champion seasons
Auburn Tigers football